William J. Brennan, known as Bill Brennan, is a former firefighter, lawyer, gadfly and activist. He was a candidate for the Democratic nomination for Governor of New Jersey in the 2017 election.

Background
Brennan worked as a firefighter in Rochester, New Hampshire and became a Teaneck, New Jersey firefighter in April 1993. He was elected Secretary of Teaneck Firefighter's Association, Firemen's Mutual Benevolent Association, Local #42 (FMBA) in 1993 and president in 1994. Brennan  filed numerous lawsuits against Teaneck's government and fire officials regarding firehouse closures and other budget cuts, among other things, including harassment. Brennan won a $3 million judgment against left its fire department in 2006.

Brennan attended Caldwell College and  Seton Hall Law School. He is a member of the New Jersey Bar. He has since been active in northern New Jersey politics and legal system. In 2010, he began producing "New Jersey Civil Circus," a program on a local public access TV channel broadcast by William Paterson University, and later cancelled by them. He was awarded damages.

Political office candidacy
In 2011 he made an unsuccessful bid to represent the 40th Legislative District in the  New Jersey General Assembly, winning about 18% of the vote.

On December 5, 2016, Brennan announced his intention to seek the nomination as Democratic candidate for the New Jersey gubernatorial election of 2017, the primary for which took place on June 6. The general election takes place on November 7. In June 2017, Governor Chris Christie said he had "admiration for everyone of them that's in the race, except for the knucklehead from, you know, where is he from, from Wayne, I think, or, whatever", referring to Brennan, who took the comment as an endorsement. Brennan garnered 11,061, or 2%, of the vote.

Positions
 Increase state income tax by 2 percent on income over $750,000 to raise $600 million to $700 million in additional tax revenue.
 "Reduce dependence on public assistance" by raising the minimum wage to $15 an hour.
 Legalise marijuana to  "generate revenue and reduce the burden on our criminal justice system while generating new employment opportunities."
 Target municipal costs associated with public employees for reductions, including removing from federal Social Security program and divert these contributions to the state pension system and to an employee-controlled retirement accounts
 Support wind power development in NJ
 Proposes NJ Transit with a mix of additional funding sources such as marijuana sales tax revenue and what he calls a "CEO pay inequality surcharge" on executives making exponentially more than their lowest-paid employees. He wants to convert Madison Square Garden, which sits above New York's Penn Station, into an integrated Port Authority bus and train terminal by at the end of  lease.
 Focus on "green" infrastructure. He says, "All new infrastructure will incorporate a renewable energy component. Bridges will harness hydro power from the rivers they cross, covered roadways will incorporate solar panels, high points on infrastructure will generate wind energy and deep borings will include geothermic capacity."

Official misconduct citizen's complaints
Brennan filed a complaint in September 2016 in the Fort Lee municipal court, alleging official misconduct by New Jersey Governor Chris Christie in regard to the Fort Lee lane closure scandal. The complaint specifically said that Christie had failed to stop the closure then in progress when, according to Wildstein's sworn testimony, Christie heard about it from Baroni and Wildstein on Wednesday, September 11, 2013, the third day of the closure. The complaint alleged that Fort Lee and its mayor "were deprived the benefit and enjoyment of their community as a consequence of this intentional evil minded act."

On April 4, 2017 Brennan filed a citizen's complaint in Newark municipal court against David Samson, former Chairman of the Port Authority of New York and New Jersey who resigned on March 28, 2014 in the aftermath of the lane closure scandal. and later pleaded guilty to extortion and bribery charges. He stated that Samson's confession to extortion and bribery was "ancillary to official misconduct." Essex County Judge Marvin Adames said will decide on April 24 if there's probable cause to issue a criminal summons for Samson to face possible state official misconduct charges. On April 24, the complaint was dismissed because the presiding judge found that Brennan had no standing because he was far removed and suffered no direct damage.

See also
List of people involved in the Fort Lee lane closure scandal

References

External links
Brennan 2017

1968 births
Date of birth missing (living people)
Living people
Activists from New Jersey
American firefighters
American political activists
Caldwell University alumni
Candidates in the 2017 United States elections
New Jersey Democrats
People from Teaneck, New Jersey
People from Wayne, New Jersey
Seton Hall University School of Law alumni